Steffi Graf defeated Monica Seles in the final, 7–6(8–6), 0–6, 6–3 to win the women's singles tennis title at the 1995 US Open. With the win, Graf equaled Chris Evert and Martina Navratilova's Open Era record of 18 major singles titles, and became the only player to achieve a quadruple career Grand Slam. It was the first major appearance for Seles since her 1993 stabbing.

Arantxa Sánchez Vicario was the defending champion, but lost in the fourth round to Mary Joe Fernández.

Seeds

Qualifying

Draw

Finals

Top half

Section 1

Section 2

Section 3

Section 4

Bottom half

Section 5

Section 6

Section 7

Section 8

External links
1995 US Open – Women's draws and results at the International Tennis Federation

Women's Singles
US Open (tennis) by year – Women's singles
1995 in women's tennis
1995 in American women's sports